Juha S. Valkama (born September 26, 1979 in Turku) is a Finnish former competitive ice dancer. He teamed up with Jessica Huot in 1999. They are the 2002–04 Finnish national champions. Their highest placement at an ISU Championship was 18th at the 2004 Europeans in Budapest, Hungary.

Valkama graduated from high school in Finland and then moved to Delaware in the United States. He later graduated from the Massachusetts Institute of Technology.

Programs 
With Huot

Results
GP: Grand Prix; JGP: Junior Grand Prix

With Huot

References

External links 

 
 Ice Dance.com profile

Navigation

Finnish male ice dancers
1979 births
Sportspeople from Turku
Living people